Kevin Nicolás Alaníz Acuña (born 30 January 2003) is a Uruguayan professional footballer who plays as a midfielder for Centro Atlético Fénix.

Club career
A youth academy graduate of Fénix, Alaníz made his professional debut on 11 May 2019 in a 3–0 loss against Progreso.

International career
Alaníz is a current Uruguay youth international. He was part of Uruguay squad at the 2019 South American U-17 Championship. He played three matches in the tournament and scored a goal.

Career statistics

References

External links
 

Living people
2003 births
People from Montevideo
Footballers from Montevideo
Association football midfielders
Uruguayan footballers
Uruguay youth international footballers
Centro Atlético Fénix players
Uruguayan Primera División players